Equinox is the second album by Sérgio Mendes and Brasil '66, with vocalists Lani Hall and Janis Hansen.

Track listing
 "Constant Rain (Chove Chuva)"  (Jorge Ben, Norman Gimbel)
 "Cinnamon and Clove"  (Johnny Mandel, Alan and Marilyn Bergman)
 "Watch What Happens"  (Michel Legrand, Jacques Demy, Norman Gimbel)
 "For Me" (Arrastão) (Edu Lobo, Norman Gimbel)
 "Bim-Bom"  (João Gilberto)
 "Night and Day" (Cole Porter)
 "Triste" (Antônio Carlos Jobim)
 "Gente"  (Marcos Valle, Paulo Sérgio Valle)
 "Wave"  (Jobim)
 "Só Danço Samba (Jazz 'n' Samba)"  (Jobim, Vinícius de Moraes)

Personnel
Musicians
Sérgio Mendes – piano, vocals
John Pisano – guitar)
Bob Matthews (2-10), William Plummer (1) – bass, sitar, vocals
José Soares – percussion, vocals
João Palma – drums
Lani Hall, Janis Hansen – vocals

Production
Bruce Botnick, Larry Levine – recording engineers

Charts

Certifications

References

1967 albums
A&M Records albums
Sérgio Mendes albums
Albums arranged by Sérgio Mendes
Portuguese-language albums
Albums produced by Herb Alpert
Albums produced by Jerry Moss
Albums recorded at Sunset Sound Recorders